The List of railway routes in Thuringia provides a list of all railway routes in Thuringia. This includes Intercity-Express, Intercity, Regional-Express, Regionalbahn services. In the route tables, the major stations are shown in bold text. Where intermediate stations are not given, these are replaced by three dots "...".

Regional services
The following Regional-Express and Regionalbahn services run through Thuringia:

Regional rail in Germany
Transport in Thuringia
Thuringia-related lists
Thuringia